Chabab Riadhi Baladiat Dar El Beïda, commonly known as CRB Dar Beida, is the basketball team of the multi-sports club that of the same name. The club is based in Dar El Beida, Algeria. Since 1997, the team has played in the first stages but was unable to achieve any title, despite reaching the Algerian Cup final five times and the final of the Super Division three times. Its best season was 2010–11, when it was runner-up in the championship and cup.

Statistics

Season by season

Trophies
Algerian Basketball Championship: 0
Runner-up (5): 2008, 2010, 2011, 2014, 2016
Algerian Basketball Cup: 0
Runner-up (5): 1997, 2006, 2011, 2012, 2015

References

External links
Team profile at Eurobasket.com
Team profile at sofascore.com

Basketball teams in Algeria